The RITA Award was the most prominent award for English-language romance fiction from 1990 to 2019. It was presented by the Romance Writers of America (RWA). The purpose of the RITA Award was to promote excellence in the romance genre by recognizing outstanding published novels and novellas. It was named for the RWA's first president, Rita Clay Estrada. It was not awarded in 2020, and was replaced by the Vivian Award, awarded for the first time in 2021.

The 2022 Vivians were postponed, with works that would have been eligible in 2022 eligible for the 2023 Vivians instead.

Procedure 
The RITA Award opened for entries in the fall. Entrants had to supply five printed books by the posted deadline.  Each title was judged by five separate judges during the preliminary round.  Finalists were announced in mid-March and winners were announced at the annual award ceremony, held on the last day of the RWA's National Conference, which was normally held in July. Winning authors received a gold statuette while book editors received a plaque.

Controversies
In recent years, the RITA and Vivian awards have increasingly been at the centers of controversies because of objectionable content and a lack of diversity in the winning works.

2015 RITA Awards controversy 
In 2015, For Such a Time, written by Kate Breslin and published by Bethany House, was nominated for two RITA Awards, in the Best Inspirational Romance and Best First Book categories. The nominations were criticized as antisemitic, because the book was set in Theresienstadt concentration camp during World War II and featured a Jewish prisoner being saved by an SS officer, falling in love with him and converting to Christianity.

2018-2020 diversity controversy
The RITA Awards, like the English-language romance fiction industry as a whole, were overwhelmingly dominated by white authors. This caused controversy in 2018 when Alyssa Cole's An Extraordinary Union, a novel about interracial romance during the American Civil War, made no appearance among the RITA Awards finalists despite winning multiple other awards. Instead, all finalists were about white women, of which all but one fell in love with British aristocrats. In response, the RWA board noted that less than half of 1% of finalists were by Black authors, of which none had ever won the award, and gave a commitment to improve the diversity of the award. The board issued an apology after the 2019 finalists again underrepresented persons of color or LGBTQ+ persons.

In 2019, Kennedy Ryan became the first Black woman to be awarded a RITA.

RWA cancelled the 2020 RITA Awards after several contestants and judges withdrew due to diversity concerns. The award was abolished as part of a major restructuring of the RWA's awards to improve the diversity of award winners, provide training for judges, and add awards for unpublished novels and better definitions of award categories and romance subgenres. A new award, the Vivian, named after Black RWA founder Vivian Stephens, was launched in late 2020.

2021 Vivian Awards controversy 
The inaugural Vivian Award in 2021 caused further controversy. The "Romance with Religious or Spiritual Elements" category winner At Love’s Command, written by Karen Witemeyer and published by Bethany House, faced criticism of anti-Indigenous racism. The book featured an American soldier as the male protagonist, who had taken part in massacres of Indigenous nations, including the Wounded Knee Massacre, and portrayed Indigenous religious practices as inferior to Christian ones. In response, Sara Whitney, the winner in the Best Mid-length Contemporary Romance category, announced that she would be returning her award in protest, because of "its narrow definition of inspirational romance and discussion of characters seeking redemption from 'crimes against humanity' prove the organization has not listened or learned from its current or former members."

The RWA initially defended the award, writing: "Romance with Religious or Spiritual Elements requires a redemptive arc as a genre convention." It said that no judges had submitted any concerns over the book, but that they would be creating a task force to assess "the overall effectiveness of the contest to include the contest process, rubric, and entry and judging guidelines." A day later, however, the RWA rescinded the award with the following statement: "We cannot in good conscience uphold the decision of the judges in voting to celebrate a book that depicts the inhumane treatment of indigenous people and romanticizes real world tragedies that still affect people to this day."

Categories 
The RITA Award categories, as of 2017, were:
Best First Book
Contemporary Romance (subcategories)
Long Contemporary Romance	
Mid-Length Contemporary Romance
Short Contemporary Romance
Erotic Romance	
Historical Romance (subcategories)
Long Historical Romance 
Short Historical Romance	
Mainstream Fiction with a Central Romance [formerly Novel with Strong Romantic Elements]
Paranormal Romance
Romance Novella 	
Romance with Religious or Spiritual Elements [formerly Inspirational Romance ]	
Romantic Suspense 
Young Adult Romance

The Vivian Award categories, as of 2021, are:

 Best First Published Book
 Contemporary Romance (subcategories)
 Long Contemporary Romance
 Mid-Length Contemporary Romance
 Short Contemporary Romance
 Erotic Romance
 Historical Romance (subcategories)
 Long Historical Romance
 Mid-Length Historical Romance
 Short Historical Romance
 Mainstream Fiction with a Central Romance
 Most Anticipated Romance
 Romance with Religious or Spiritual Elements 
 Romantic Suspense (subcategories)
 Long Romantic Romance
 Mid-Length Romantic Romance
 Short Romantic Romance
 Speculative Romance (subcategories)
 Long Speculative Romance
 Mid-Length Speculative Romance
 Short Speculative Romance
 Young Adult Romance

RITA Award winners

Source: RWA

Best First Book
 1990 Out of the Blue by Alaina Hawthorne
 1991 Black Horse Island by Dee Holmes
 1992 Candle in the Window by Christina Dodd
 1993 Trust Me by Jeane Renick
 1994 A Candle in the Dark by Megan Chance
 1995 Ghostly Enchantment by Angie Ray
 1996 The Warlord by Elizabeth Elliott
 1997 Stardust of Yesterday by Lynn Kurland
 1998 Brazen Angel by Elizabeth Boyle
 1999 My Darling Caroline by Adele Ashworth
 2000 The Maiden and The Unicorn by Isolde Martyn
 2001 A Man Like Mac by Fay Robinson
 2002 The Border Bride by Elizabeth English
 2003 Shades of Honor by Wendy Lindstrom
 2004 Back Roads by Susan Crandall
 2005 Time Off For Good Behavior by Lani Diane Rich
 2006 Show Her The Money by Stephanie Feagan
 2007 The Husband Trap by Tracy Anne Warren
 2008 Dead Girls Are Easy by Terri Garey
 2009 Oh. My. Gods. by Tera Lynn Childs
 2010 One Scream Away by Kate Brady
 2011 Pieces of Sky by Kaki Warner
 2012 First Grave on the Right by Darynda Jones
 2013 The Haunting of Maddy Clare by Simone St. James
 2014 The Sweet Spot by Laura Drake
 2015 Run to You by Clara Kensie
 2016 Forget Tomorrow by Pintip Dunn
 2017 Once and For All: An American Valor Novel by Cheryl Etchison
2018 Take the Lead by Alexis Daria
2019 Lady in Waiting by Marie Tremayne

Contemporary Romance
 1982
 Category Contemporary: Winner Take All by Brooke Hastings
 Mainstream Contemporary: The Sun Dancers by Barbara Faith
 1983
 Contemporary Mainstream: Opal Fires by Lynda Trent
 Contemporary Sensual: The Heart’s Victory by Nora Roberts
 Contemporary Sweet: Renegade Player by Dixie Browning
 1984
 Contemporary Under 65,000 words: Memory and Desire by Eileen Bryan
 Contemporary 65–80,000 words: This Magic Moment by Nora Roberts & Destiny's Sweet Errand by Deirdre Mardon
 Traditional: Untamed by Nora Roberts
 1985
 Long Contemporary Series: A Matter of Choice by Nora Roberts
 Mainstream: After All These Years by Kathleen Gilles Seidel
 Short Contemporary: Opposites Attract by Nora Roberts
 Traditional: The Karas Cup by Brittany Young
 1986
 Long Contemporary Series: Today, Tomorrow and Always by Georgia Bockoven
 Short Contemporary: Much Needed Holiday by Joan Hohl
 Single Title: Banish Misfortune by Anne Stuart
 Traditional: The Crystal Unicorn by Doreen Malek
 1987
 Long Contemporary Series: One Summer by Nora Roberts
 Short Contemporary: Still Waters by Kathleen Creighton
 Single Title: Sunshine and Shadow by Tom and Sharon Curtis
 Traditional:	Opal Fire by Sandy Dengler
 1988
 Long Contemporary Series: In the Defense of Love by Kathleen Creighton
 Short Contemporary: Stolen Moments by Terri Herrington
 Single Title: Twilight Whispers by Barbara Delinsky
 Traditional:	It Takes a Thief by Rita Rainville
 1989
 Long Contemporary Series: A Crime of the Heart by Cheryl Reavis
 Short Contemporary: Winter’s Daughter by Kathleen Creighton
 Single Title: Leaves of Fortune by Linda Barlow
 Traditional: Flirtation River by Bethany Campbell
 1990
 Long Contemporary Series: The Ice Cream Man by Kathleen Korbel
 Short Contemporary Series: 	Night of the Hunter by Jennifer Greene
 Single Title Contemporary: Private Relations by Diane Chamberlain
 Traditional: Rhapsody in Bloom by Mona Van Wieren
 1991
 Long Contemporary Series: Patrick Gallagher’s Widow by Cheryl Reavis
 Short Contemporary Series: Step Into My Parlor by Jan Hudson
 Traditional: Song of the Lorelei by Lucy Gordon
 1992
 Long Contemporary Series: A Rose for Maggie by Kathleen Korbel
 Short Contemporary Series: A Human Touch by Glenda Sanders
 Single Title Contemporary: A Man to Die For by Eileen Dreyer
 Traditional: Every Kind of Heaven by Bethany Campbell
 1993
 Long Contemporary Series: The Silence of Midnight by Karen Young
 Short Contemporary Series: Navarrone by Helen R. Myers
 Single Title Contemporary: This Time Forever by Kathleen Eagle
 Traditional: Father Goose by Marie Ferrarella
 1994
 Long Contemporary Series: Dragonslayer by Emilie Richards
 Short Contemporary Series: Avenging Angel by Glenna McReynolds
 Contemporary Single Title: Private Scandals by Nora Roberts
 Traditional: Annie and the Wise Men by Lindsay Longford
 1995
 Contemporary Single Title: Again by Kathleen Gilles Seidel
 Long Contemporary Series: A Soldier’s Heart by Kathleen Korbel
 Short Contemporary Series: Getting Rid of Bradley by Jennifer Crusie
 Traditional: Oh Baby! by Lauryn Chandler
 1996
 Contemporary Single Title: Born in Ice by Nora Roberts
 Long Contemporary Series: The Morning Side of Dawn by Justine Davis
 Short Contemporary Series: Single Dad by Jennifer Greene
 Traditional: Stranger in Her Arms by Elizabeth Sites
 1997
 Contemporary Single Title: Daniel’s Gift by Barbara Freethy
 Long Contemporary Series: Wild Blood by Naomi Horton
 Short Contemporary Series: Cowboy Pride by Anne McAllister
 Traditional: Her Very Own Husband by Lauryn Chandler
 1998
 Contemporary Single Title: Nobody's Baby But Mine by Susan Elizabeth Phillips
 Long Contemporary Series: Reckless by Ruth Wind
 Short Contemporary Series: Nobody's Princess by Jennifer Greene
 Traditional: His Brother's Child by Lucy Gordon
 1999
 Contemporary Single Title: Dream A Little Dream by Susan Elizabeth Phillips
 Long Contemporary: Meant to Be Married by Ruth Wind
 Short Contemporary: The Notorious Groom by Caroline Cross
 Traditional: Monday Man by Kristin Gabriel
 2000
 Contemporary Single Title: Body Guard by Suzanne Brockmann
 Long Contemporary: Undercover Princess by Suzanne Brockmann
 Short Contemporary: The Stardust Cowboy by Anne McAllister
 Traditional: Annie, Get Your Groom by Kristin Gabriel
 2001
 Contemporary Single Title: First Lady by Susan Elizabeth Phillips
 Long Contemporary: Rogue's Reform by Marilyn Pappano
 Short Contemporary: It Takes A Rebel by Stephanie Bond
 Traditional Romance: The Best Man & The Bridesmaid by Liz Fielding
 2002
 Contemporary Single Title: True Confessions by Rachel Gibson
 Long Contemporary: Coming Home To You by Fay Robinson
 Short Contemporary: A Long Hot Christmas by Barbara Daly
 Traditional: Quinn's Complete Seduction by Sandra Steffen
 2003
 Contemporary Single Title: No Place Like Home by Barbara Samuel
 Long Contemporary: Taking Cover by Catherine Mann
 Short Contemporary: Taming The Outlaw by Cindy Kay Gerard
 Traditional: The Christmas Basket by Debbie Macomber
 2004
 Contemporary Single Title: Birthright by Nora Roberts
 Long Contemporary: The Top Gun's Return by Kathleen Creighton
 Short Contemporary: The Knight's Kiss by Nicole Burnham
 Traditional: Her Royal Baby by Marion Lennox
 2005
 Contemporary Single Title: Bet Me by Jennifer Crusie
 Long Contemporary: John Riley's Girl by Inglath Cooper
 Short Contemporary: Miss Pruitt's Private Life by Barbara McCauley
 Traditional: Christmas Eve Marriage by Jessica Hart
 2006
 Contemporary Single Title: Lakeside Cottage by Susan Wiggs
 Long Contemporary: Worth Every Risk by Dianna Love Snell
 Short Contemporary: The Marriage Miracle by Liz Fielding
 Traditional: Princess of Convenience by Marion Lennox
 2007
 Contemporary Single Title: Adios To My Old Life by Caridad Ferrer
 Long Contemporary: The Mommy Quest by Lori Handeland
 Short Contemporary: From the First by Jessica Bird
 Traditional: Claiming His Family by Barbara Hannay
 2008 
 Contemporary Single Title: Catch of the Day by Kristan Higgins
 Contemporary Series: Snowbound by Janice Johnson
 Contemporary Series-Suspense/Adventure: Treasure by Helen Brenna
 2009 
 Contemporary Single Title: Not Another Bad Date by Rachel Gibson
 Contemporary Series: A Mother's Wish by Karen Templeton
 Contemporary Series-Suspense/Adventure: Danger Signals by Kathleen Creighton
 2010
 Contemporary Single Title: Too Good To Be True by Kristan Higgins
 Contemporary Series: A Not-So-Perfect Past by Beth Andrews
 Contemporary Series-Suspense/Adventure: The Soldier's Secret Daughter by Cindy Dees
 2011
 Contemporary Single Title: Simply Irresistible by Jill Shalvis
 Contemporary Series: Welcome Home, Cowboy by Karen Templeton
 Contemporary Series-Suspense/Adventure: The Moon That Night by Helen Brenna
 2012
 Contemporary Single Title: Boomerang Bride by Fiona Lowe
 Contemporary Series: Doukaki's Apprentice by Sarah Morgan
 Contemporary Series-Suspense/Adventure: Soldier's Last Stand by Cindy Dees
 2013
 Contemporary Single Title: The Way Back Home by Barbara Freethy
 Long Contemporary Series: A Gift For All Season by Karen Templeton
 Short Contemporary Series: A Night of No Return by Sarah Morgan
 2014 
 Contemporary Single Title: Crazy Thing Called Love by Molly O'Keefe
 Short Contemporary Series: Why Resist a Rebel? by Leah Ashton
 2015
 Long Contemporary Romance: Baby, It's You by Jane Graves
 Mid-Length Contemporary Romance: One in a Million by Jill Shalvis
 Short Contemporary Romance: A Texas Rescue Christmas by Caro Carson
 2016
 Long Contemporary Romance: Brokedown Cowboy by Maisey Yates
 Mid-Length Contemporary Romance: Him by Sarina Bowen and Elle Kennedy (first self-published winner in this category)
 Short Contemporary Romance: The Nanny Plan by Sarah M. Anderson
 2017 
 Long Contemporary Romance: Miracle on 5th Avenue by Sarah Morgan
 Mid-Length Contemporary Romance: Carolina Dreaming by Virginia Kantra
 Short Contemporary Romance: Christmas on Crimson Mountain by Michelle Major
 2018
 Long Contemporary Romance:  Falling Hard by Lexi Ryan
 Mid-Length Contemporary Romance: Tell Me by Abigail Strom
 Short Contemporary Romance: Second Chance Summer"by Kait Nolan
2019
 Long Contemporary Romance: Long Shot by Kennedy Ryan
 Mid-Length Contemporary Romance:  Advanced Physical Chemistry by Susannah Nix
 Short Contemporary Romance: The Bachelor’s Baby Surprise by Teri Wilson

Erotic Romance
 2014 Claim Me by J. Kenner
 2015 The Saint by Tiffany Reisz
 2016 For Real: A Spires Story by Alexis Hall
 2017 Off the Clock by Roni Loren
 2018 Wicked Dirty by J. Kenner
 2019 Three-Way Split by Elia Winters

Historical Romance 
 1982
 Best Mainstream Historical Romance: 	Day Beyond Destiny by Anna James
 Best Category Historical Romance: Rendezvous at Gramercy by Constance Ravenlock
 1983
 Best Mainstream Historical Romance:	The Endearment by LaVyrle Spencer
 Best Category Historical Romance: Defiant Love by Mara Seger
 1984
 Best Historical Romance: Hummingbird by LaVyrle Spencer
 Best Category Historical Romance: The Clergyman’s Daughter by Julie Jeffries
 1985
 Best Regency Romance: The Lurid Lady Lockport by Kasey Micheals
 Best Historical Romance: Twice Loved by LaVyrle Spencer
 1986
 Best Regency Romance: The Beauty’s Daughter by Monette Cummings
 Best Historical Romance: Not So Wild a Dream by Francine Rivers
 1987
 Best Regency Romance: Lord Abberley’s Nemesis by Amanda Scott
 Best Historical Romance: By Right of Arms by Robyn Carr
 1988
 Best Regency Romance: Sugar Rose by Susan Carroll
 Best Historical Romance: The Gamble by LaVyrle Spencer
 1989
 Best Regency Romance: Brighton Road by Susan Carroll
 Best Historical Romance: Sunflower by Jill Marie Landis
 1990
 Best Series Historical: Silver Noose by Patricia Gardner
 Best Single Title Historical: The Bride by Julie Garwood
 Best Regency Romance: The Rake and the Reformer by Mary Jo Putney
 1991
 Best Series Historical: A Wild Yearning by Penelope Williamson
 Best Single Title Historical : Where Love Dwells by Elizabeth Stuart
 Best Regency Romance: The Sandalwood Princess by Loretta Chase
 1992
 Best Series Historical: The Tender Texan by Jodi Thomas
 Best Single Title Historical: Courting Miss Hattie by Pamela Morsi
 Best Regency Romance: Emily and the Dark Angel by Jo Beverley
 1993
 Best Historical Series: The Prisoner by Cheryl Reavis
 Best Historical Single Title: Keeper of the Dream by Penelope Williamson
 Best Regency Romance: An Unwilling Bride by Jo Beverley
 1994
 Best Historical Series: My Lady Notorious by Jo Beverley
 Best Historical Single Title: Untamed by Elizabeth Lowell
 Best Regency Romance: Deidre and Don Juan by Jo Beverley
 1995
 Best Historical Romance: To Tame a Texan’s Heart by Jodi Thomas
 Best Long Historical Romance: Dancing on the Wind by Mary Jo Putney
 Best Regency Romance: Mrs. Drew Plays Her Hand by Carla Kelly
 1996
 Long Historical Romance: Something Shady by Pamela Morsi
 Short Historical Romance: Lord of Scoundrels by Loretta Chase
 Best Regency Romance: Gwen's Christmas Ghost by Lynn Kerstan and Alicia Rasley
 1997
 Long Historical Romance: Conor's Way by Laura Lee Guhrke
 Short Historical Romance: Always to Remember by Lorraine Heath
 Best Regency Romance: The Lady's Companion by Carla Kelly
 1998
 Long Historical Romance: Promise of Jenny Jones by Maggie Osborne
 Short Historical Romance: Heart of a Knight by Barbara Samuel
 Best Regency Romance: Love's Reward by Jean R. Ewing
 1999
 Long Historical Romance: My Dearest Enemy by Connie Brockway
 Short Historical Romance: Merely Married by Patricia Coughlin
 Best Regency Romance: His Grace Endures by Emma Jenson 
 2000
 Long Historical Romance: Silken Threads by Patricia Ryan
 Short Historical Romance: The Proposition by Judith Ivory
 Best Regency Romance: The Rake's Retreat by Nancy Butler
 2001
 Long Historical Romance: Devilish by Jo Beverley
 Short Historical Romance: The Mistress by Susan Wiggs
 Best Regency Romance: A Grand Design by Emma Jensen 
 2002
 Long Historical Romance: The Bridal Season by Connie Brockway
 Short Historical Romance: Tempt Me Twice by Barbara Dawson Smith
 Best Regency Romance: Much Obliged by Jessica Benson
 2003
 Long Historical Romance: Stealing Heaven by Madeline Hunter
 Short Historical Romance: The Bride Fair by Cheryl Reavis
 Best Regency Romance: Debt to Delia by Barbara Metzger
 2004
 Long Historical Romance: The Destiny by Kathleen Givens
 Short Historical Romance: Worth Any Price by Lisa Kleypas
 Best Regency Romance: Prospero's Daughter by Nancy Butler
 2005
 Long Historical Romance: Shadowheart by Laura Kinsale
 Short Historical Romance: A Wanted Man by Susan Kay Law
 Best Regency Romance: A Passionate Endeavor by Sophia Nash
 2006
 Long Historical Romance: The Devil to Pay by Liz Carlyle
 Short Historical Romance: The Texan's Reward by Jodi Thomas
 Best Regency Romance: A Reputable Rake by Diane Gaston
 2007
 Long Historical Romance: On the Way to the Wedding by Julia Quinn
 Short Historical Romance: The Book of True Desires by Betina Krahn
 2008 
 Historical Romance: Lessons of Desire by Madeline Hunter
 Regency Historical Romance: The Secret Diaries of Miss Miranda Cheever by Julia Quinn
 2009 
 Historical Romance: The Edge of Impropriety by Pam Rosenthal
 Regency Historical Romance: My Lord and Spymaster by Joanna Bourne
 2010 
 Historical Romance: Not Quite a Husband by Sherry Thomas
 Regency Historical Romance: What Happens in London by Julia Quinn
 2011 
 Historical Romance: His at Night by Sherry Thomas
 Regency Historical Romance: The Mischief of the Mistletoe by Lauren Willig
 2012 
 Historical Romance: The Black Hawk by Joanna Bourne
 Regency Historical Romance: A Night to Surrender by Tessa Dare
 2013 
 Historical Romance: A Rogue by Any Other Name by Sarah MacLean
 2014 
 Historical Romance: No Good Duke Goes Unpunished by Sarah MacLean
 2015
 Long Historical Romance: Fool Me Twice by Meredith Duran
 Short Historical Romance: Romancing the Duke by Tessa Dare
 2016
 Long Historical Romance: Tiffany Girl by Deeanne Gist
 Short Historical Romance: It Started with a Scandal by Julie Anne Long
 2017
 Long Historical Romance: No Mistress of Mine by Laura Lee Guhrke
 Short Historical Romance: A Duke to Remember by Kelly Bowen
 2018
 Long Historical Romance: Between the Devil and the Duke by Kelly Bowen
 Short Historical Romance: Waltzing with the Earl by Catherine Tinley
 2019
 Long Historical Romance: A Wicked Kind of Husband by Mia Vincy
 Short Historical Romance: A Duke in the Night by Kelly Bowen

Mainstream Fiction with a Central Romance (Novel with Strong Romantic Elements prior to 2017) 
 2004 Between Sisters by Kristin Hannah
 2005 A.K.A. Goddess by Evelyn Vaughn
 2006 Lady Luck's Map of Vegas by Barbara Samuel
 2007 A Lady Raised High by Jennifer Ashley w/a Laurien Gardner
 2008 Silent in the Grave by Deanna Raybourn
 2009 Tribute by Nora Roberts
 2010 The Lost Recipe for Happiness by Barbara O'Neal
 2011 Welcome to Harmony by Jodi Thomas
 2012 How to Bake a Perfect Life by Barbara O'Neal
 2013 The Haunting of Maddy Clare by Simone St. James
 2014 - 2016 No winners
 2017 The Moon in the Palace by Weina Dai Randel
 2018 Now that You Mention It by Kristan Higgins
 2019 How to Keep a Secret by Sarah Morgan

Paranormal Romance
 1992 Angel for Hire by Justine Davis
 1993 Emily’s Ghost by Antoinette Stokenberg
 1994 Falling Angel by Anne Stuart
 1995 Lord of the Storm by Justine Davis
 1996 The Covenant by Modean Moon
 1997 Stardust of Yesterday by Lynn Kurland
 1998 FireHawk by Justine Dare
 1999 The Bride Finder by Susan Carroll
 2000 Nell by Jeanette Baker
 2001 The Highlander's Touch by Karen Marie Moning
 2002 Heart Mate by Robin D. Owens
 2003 Contact by Susan Grant
 2004 Shades of Midnight by Linda Fallon
 2005 Blue Moon by Lori Handeland
 2006 Gabriel's Ghost by Linnea Sinclair
 2007 A Hunger Like No Other by Kresley Cole
 2008 Lover Revealed by J.R. Ward
 2009 Seducing Mr. Darcy by Gwyn Cready
 2010 Kiss of a Demon King by Kresley Cole
 2011 Unchained: The Dark Forgotten by Sharon Ashwood
 2012 Dragon Bound by Thea Harrison
 2013 Shadow's Claim by Kresley Cole
 2014 The Firebird by Susanna Kearsley
 2015 Evernight by Kristen Callihan
 2016 Must Love Chainmail by Angela Quarles (first self-published winner in this category)
 2017 The Pages of the Mind by Jeffe Kennedy
 2018 Hunt the Darkness by Stephanie Rowe
 2019 Dearest Ivie by J. R. Ward

Romance Novella
 2000 Starry, Starry Night by Marianne Willman
 2001 Final Approach to Forever by Merline Lovelace from Once Upon A Dream
 2002 I Will by Lisa Kleypas from Wish List
 2003 To Kiss in Shadows by Lynn Kurland
 2004 Prisoner of the Tower by Gayle Wilson in The Wedding Chase
 2005 Her Enemy by Maggie Shayne in Night's Edge
 2006 The Naked Truth about Guys by Alesia Holliday in The Naked Truth
 2007 Tis the Silly Season by Roxanne St. Claire in A NASCAR Holiday
 2008 Born in My Heart by Jennifer Greene in Like Mother, Like Daughter
 2009 The Fall of Rogue Gerard by Stephanie Laurens in It Happened One Night
 2010 The Christmas Eve Promise by Molly O'Keefe in The Night Before Christmas
 2011 Shifting Sea by Virginia Kantra in Burning Up
 2012 I Love the Earl by Caroline Linden
 2013 Seduced by a Pirate by Eloisa James
 2014 Take Me, Cowboy by Jane Porter
 2015 His Road Home by Anna Richland
 2016 Nice Girls Don't Ride by Roni Loren
 2017 Her Every Wish by Courtney Milan
 2018 Forbidden River by Brynn Kelly
 2019 Bad Blood by M. Malone

Romance with Religious or Spiritual Elements (Inspirational Romance prior to 2017) 
 1985 For the Love of Mike by Charlotte Nichols
 1986 From This Day Forward by Kathleen Karr
 1987-1994 (no award)
 1995 An Echo in the Darkness by Francine Rivers
 1996 As Sure as the Dawn by Francine Rivers
 1997 The Scarlet Thread by Francine Rivers
 1998 Homeward by Melody Carlson
 1999 Patterns of Love by Robin Lee Hatcher
 2000 Danger in the Shadows by Dee Henderson
 2001 The Shepherd's Voice by Robin Lee Hatcher
 2002 Beneath a Southern Sky by Deborah Raney
 2003 Never Say Goodbye by Irene Hannon
 2004 Autumn Dreams by Gayle Roper
 2005 Grounds To Believe by Shelley Bates
 2006 Heavens To Betsy by Beth Pattillo
 2007 Revealed by Tamera Alexander
 2008 A Touch of Grace by Linda Goodnight
 2009 Finding Stefanie by Susan May Warren
 2010 The Inheritance by Tamera Alexander
 2011 In Harm's Way by Irene Hannon
 2012 The Measure of Katie Calloway by Serena B. Miller
 2013 Against the Tide by Elizabeth Camden
 2014 Five Days in Skye by Carla Laureano
 2015 Deceived by Irene Hannon
 2016 A Noble Masquerade by Kristi Ann Hunter
 2017 My Hope Next Door by Tammy L. Gray
 2018 Then There Was You by Kara Isaac
 2019 The Saturday Night Supper Club by Carla Laureano

Romantic Suspense
 1989 Brazen Virtue by Nora Roberts
 1990 Perchance to Dream by Kathleen Korbel
 1991 Night Spice by Karen Keast
 1992 Night Shift by Nora Roberts
 1993 Divine Evil by Nora Roberts
 1994 Nightshade by Nora Roberts
 1995 Hidden Riches by Nora Roberts
 1996 Winter’s Edge by Anne Stuart
 1997 See How They Run by Bethany Campbell
 1998 On the Way to a Wedding by Ingrid Weave
 1999 Cool Shade by Theresa Weir
 2000 The Bride's Protector by Gayle Wilson
 2001 Carolina Moon by Nora Roberts
 2002 The Surgeon by Tess Gerritsen
 2003 Three Fates by Nora Roberts
 2004 Remember When - Part 1 by Nora Roberts
 2005 I'm Watching You by Karen Rose
 2006 Survivor in Death by J.D. Robb
 2007 Blackout by Annie Solomon
 2008 Ice Blue by Anne Stuart
 2009 Take No Prisoners by Cindy Gerard
 2010 Whisper of Warning by Laura Griffin
 2011 Silent Scream by Karen Rose
 2012 New York to Dallas by J.D. Robb
 2013 Scorched by Laura Griffin
 2014 Off the Edge by Carolyn Crane (first self-published winner)
 2015 Concealed in Death by J.D. Robb
 2016 Flash Fire by Dana Marton
 2017 Repressed by Elisabeth Naughton
 2018 The Fixer by HelenKay Dimon
 2019 Fearless by Elizabeth Dyer

Young Adult Romance
 1983 Andrea by Jo Stewart
 1984 Julie’s Magic Moment by Barbara Bartholomew
 1985 The Frog Princess by Cheryl Zach
 1986 Waiting for Amanda by Cheryl Zach
 1987 Video Fever by Kathleen Garvey
 1988 Does Your Nose Get in the Way, Too? by Arlene Erlbach
 1989 The Ghosts of Stony Cove by Eileen Charbonneau
 1990 Renee by Vivan Schurfranz
 1991 (no award)
 1992 Now I Lay Me Down to Sleep by Lurlene McDaniel
 1993 Song of the Buffalo Boy by Sherry Garland
 1994 Summer Lightning by Wendy Corsi Staub
 1995 Second to None by Arleynn Presser
 1996 Runaway by Cheryl Zach
 1997 - 2007 (no award)
 2008 Wicked Lovely by Melissa Marr
 2009 Hell Week by Rosemary Clement-Moore
 2010 Perfect Chemistry by Simone Elkeles
 2011 The Iron King by Julie Kagawa
 2012 Enclave by Ann Aguirre
 2013 The Farm by Emily McKay
 2015 Boys Like You by Juliana Stone
 2016 The Anatomical Shape of a Heart by Jenn Bennett
 2017 The Problem with Forever by Jennifer L. Armentrout
 2018 Seize Today by Pintip Dunn
 2019 My So-Called Bollywood Life by Nisha Sharma

Best Romance (RWA's Favorite Book in 1998)
 1990 Morning Glory by LaVyrle Spencer
 1991 The Prince of Midnight by Laura Kinsale
 1992 Outlander by Diana Gabaldon
 1993 Come Spring by Jill Marie Landis
 1994 Lord of the Night by Susan Wiggs
 1995 It Had To Be You by Susan Elizabeth Phillips
 1996 Born in Ice by Nora Roberts
 1998 Nobody's Baby But Mine by Susan Elizabeth Phillips

Vivian Award winners

Best First Book
 2021: Love Me Like a Love Song by Annmarie Boyle

Contemporary Romance 
 2021
 Long Contemporary Romance: False Start by Jessica Ruddick
 Mid-Length Contemporary Romance: Tempting Taste by Sara Whitney
 Short Contemporary Romance: Engaging the Enemy by Reese Ryan

Erotic Romance 
 2021: Pure Satisfaction by Rebecca Hunter

Historical Romance 
 2021
 Long Historical Romance: Ten Things I Hate About the Duke by Loretta Chase
 Mid-Length Historical Romance: A Study in Passion by Louisa Cornell

Mainstream Fiction with a Central Romance 
 2021: An Everyday Hero by Laura Trentham

Most Anticipated Romance 
 2021: Burning Caine by Janet Oppedisano

Romance with Religious or Spiritual Elements 
 2021: At Love's Command by Karen Witemeyer. The award was rescinded (see above).

Romantic Suspense 
 2021
 Long Romantic Suspense: Hail Mary by Hope Anika
 Mid-Length Romantic Suspense: Storm by Janie Crouch

Speculative Romance 
 2021
 Long Speculative Romance: A Stitch in Time by Kelley Armstrong
 Mid-Length Speculative Romance: Betwixt by Darynda Jones

References

External links 

 RITA Awards at Romance Writers of America 

Romantic fiction awards
American literary awards
Awards established in 1982
1982 establishments in the United States

Novella awards